Urgent computing is prioritized and immediate access on supercomputers and grids for emergency computations such as severe weather prediction during matters of immediate concern. 

Applications that provide decision makers with information during critical emergencies cannot waste time waiting in job queues and need access to computational resources  as soon as possible.

References

Grid computing
Supercomputers